Ronnie Lee Edwards (born 28 March 2003) is an English footballer who plays as a defender for Peterborough United.

Club career
Edwards joined Barnet at the age of nine, and progressed through the club's academy, captaining the under-18s. Aged sixteen, he made his senior debut when he captained a young Bees side in a Middlesex Senior Cup game against Staines Town on 17 December 2019. Four days later he made his league debut as a late substitute against Maidenhead United in December 2019. He made five appearances for the Bees in the 2019-20 season, before joining Peterborough United after a successful trial against Peterborough Sports in August 2020. He made his debut on 8 September 2020 in the EFL Trophy against Burton Albion.

Edwards made his full league debut on 15 December 2020 in a 1–1 draw away to Milton Keynes Dons.

International career
Edwards was called up to a training camp with the England U19 national team in May 2021. In October 2021, he was called up to the full U19 squad for the friendly Marbella Cup tournament and made his debut during a 3-1 defeat against France.

On 17 June 2022, Edwards was included in the England U19 squad for the 2022 UEFA European Under-19 Championship. He started in the final as England won the tournament with a 3-1 extra time victory over Israel on 1 July 2022.

On 21 September 2022, Edwards made his England U20 debut during a 3-0 victory over Chile at the Pinatar Arena.

Career statistics

Honours
England U19s

 UEFA European Under-19 Championship: 2022
Individual

 Peterborough United Player of the Season: 2021–22

References

2003 births
Living people
English footballers
England youth international footballers
Association football defenders
Barnet F.C. players
Peterborough United F.C. players
English Football League players
National League (English football) players